Reginald Rodrigues, also known as Reg Rodricks (29 May 1922 – 15 August 1995) was an Indian field hockey player who competed in the 1948 Summer Olympics for the Indian gold medal winning team. India had just gained its independence from Great Britain. He died on 15 August 1995 at the age of 73.

References

External links 
 
 Reginald Rodrigues at databaseOlympics.com
 

1922 births
1995 deaths
Field hockey players from Goa
Olympic field hockey players of India
Field hockey players at the 1948 Summer Olympics
Indian male field hockey players
Olympic gold medalists for India
Olympic medalists in field hockey
Medalists at the 1948 Summer Olympics
Indian emigrants to Canada